The 2004 4 Nations Cup was the ninth playing of the annual women's ice hockey tournament. It was held in Lake Placid, New York and Burlington, Vermont, from November 10–14, 2004.

Results

Preliminary round

All times are local (UTC−5).

Bronze Medal

Gold Medal

External links
Tournament on hockeyarchives.info
News on HockeyCanada.ca
News on HockeyCanada.ca
Tournament on TeamUSA.usahockey.com

2004-05
2004–05 in Finnish ice hockey
2004–05 in Swedish ice hockey
2004–05 in Canadian women's ice hockey
2004–05 in American women's ice hockey
2004-05
2004–05 in women's ice hockey